The National Children's Cancer Society (NCCS) is an American charity based in St. Louis, Missouri, which provides emotional, financial and educational support to children with cancer, their families and survivors.

The group was initially founded in 1987 to help pay for the then relatively new bone marrow transplantation procedure for children, which was at the time not covered by most American health insurance. Since that time, insurance now covers the procedure, and the scope of the charity has expanded into other areas.

The charity reports that over its history it has given "$63 million in direct financial assistance to more than 40,000 children," in addition to assistance through other programs.

References

External links
 

Charities based in Missouri
Cancer charities in the United States
Organizations established in 1987
Medical and health organizations based in Missouri